Joanne Daniels (1931–2023) was an American voice actress. She was best known as the voice of telephone company time and temperature announcements for the Weatherchron company of Atlanta, Georgia (a competitor of Audichron), used in various parts of the United States including Los Angeles, California.

She also provided the voice for a significant number of number change announcements.  Automated messages advising callers that the number had been changed and what the new number was were concatenated from recorded samples of her pronouncing the digits and other relevant phrases.

Other notable appearances
Daniels, as the time lady, is the first voice heard in the opening sequence of Real Time with Bill Maher.

See also

 Jane Barbe
 Pat Fleet

References

External links
 Audio interview with Joanne Daniels SFGate.com
 1970s-era Bell System AIS featuring Joanne Daniels' voice, Flushing, Queens, New York; recorded in 1992

American voice actresses
Bell System
Telephone voiceover talent
21st-century American women